Robert Thomas Cramer (born October 28, 1979) is a former professional baseball pitcher.

Career
Cramer signed with the Tampa Bay Devil Rays as a non-drafted free agent in 2003.  He did not pitch in 2005 or 2006.  He signed a minor league deal with the Athletics on May 18, 2007. Cramer pitched for the Orange County Flyers of the independent Golden League in 2008.  He rejoined the Athletics organization in 2009.  In 2010, he was loaned to the Tigres de Quintana Roo of the Mexican League.  He was returned in August 2010.

He was promoted to the major leagues for the first time on September 10, 2010. In his Major League debut, Cramer defeated the Kansas City Royals 3–1 on September 13, 2010

On July 1, 2011, Cramer was designated for assignment. He was released on July 11.

Married to Larissa Guzman since July 3, 2020.

References

External links

1979 births
Living people
American expatriate baseball players in Japan
American expatriate baseball players in Mexico
Bakersfield Blaze players
Baseball players from Anaheim, California
Broncos de Reynosa players
Charleston RiverDogs players
Hudson Valley Renegades players
Long Beach State Dirtbags baseball players
Major League Baseball pitchers
Mexican League baseball pitchers
Midland RockHounds players
Nippon Professional Baseball pitchers
Oakland Athletics players
Orange County Flyers players
Sacramento River Cats players
Stockton Ports players
Tigres de Quintana Roo players
Yokohama DeNA BayStars players